The Thalbahn Habsheim (German for Habsheim Valley Railway) was a  long narrow-gauge railway with a gauge of  at Habsheim in Alsace

History 
The Thalbahn was built during the First World War by German soldiers and Romanian prisoners of war as a military light railway with a gauge of 600 mm. For the construction of the route, steel rails were permanently laid onto wooden sleepers.

Route 
The route ran initially from Habsheim railway station to the southwest to Tagsdorf.

Buildings 
The railway staff's offices were located in Landser's town hall and on the first floor of the Le Bœuf Rouge restaurant.

The camp of the Romanian prisoners of war was located within a military camp at the eastern exit of Dietweiler. Many prisoners of war died due to malnutrition, forced labor and the poor living conditions and were buried in the Romanian cemetery in Dietweiler.

Locomotives 

One of the locomotives was the O&K ten-wheeler No. 8285/1917 (0-10-0). It was delivered on 13 June 1917 from Berlin and is now preserved on the Chemin de fer Froissy-Dompierre.

References

External links 
 
 A commemoration of the travels on railways that were built or operated by Kodeis B (commander of the railway troops) in the period from 28 May to 3 June 1918, Goswin von Haag, Captain & Commander of the Railway Troops

 
600 mm gauge railways in France
Railway lines in Grand Est